Dominic Raiola (born December 30, 1978) is a former American football center. He was a second-round pick of the Detroit Lions in the 2001 NFL Draft, and played his entire 14-year career for the Lions of the National Football League (NFL). Prior to that he played college football for the University of Nebraska and earned All-American.

In June 2016, Raiola was hired by the Detroit Lions as a strength and conditioning assistant coach.

Early years
Raiola was born in Honolulu, Hawaii. He attended Saint Louis School in Honolulu, and played for the Saint Louis Crusaders high school football team. One of his teammates was Olin Kreutz, two years his senior. The Crusaders were undefeated in his last three years at the school; in 1996, his senior year, the team won its 11th straight Prep Bowl. That same year, St. Louis High was nationally ranked as the 15th-best team in the United States.

College career
Raiola attended the University of Nebraska at Lincoln, where he played for the Nebraska Cornhuskers football team from 1998 to 2000.  In his first year, he became the first freshman offensive lineman to start a game for the Cornhuskers since 1991. In 1999, he became the first sophomore center for the team since Dave Rimington to participate in postseason play, and set a school record for knockdowns, which he bettered in 2000.  Following his junior season in 2000, he won the Rimington Trophy as the best center in college football, and was recognized as a consensus first-team All-American.

Professional career

2001 NFL Draft
Raiola was drafted by the Detroit Lions in the 2001 NFL Draft in the second round. He was the highest selected Nebraska offensive lineman since Zach Wiegert in the 1995 NFL Draft, and the highest selected center since Dave Rimington in 1983. He was also the first center drafted by the Lions since Jeff Hartings in 1996.

Detroit Lions
Raiola started to get game time as a replacement center in the latter half of the season in a game against the San Francisco 49ers in November; it was his first game in that position. He was selected as a member of Pro Football Weekly's All-Rookie squad during that season.

In 2002, Raiola started all 16 games of the season, winning the Chuck Hughes Most Improved Player award. He was a key member of the offensive line which allowed only 20 quarterback sacks for the season, the lowest in the NFL and then a franchise record. Raiola protected both quarterback Joey Harrington and running back James Stewart.

In 2003, Raiola was a 16-game starter and a key part of the offensive line. During that season, the offensive line allowed just 11 sacks, a new record for the franchise. He also played more special teams, and became the long snapper when Bradford Banta broke his clavicle against the San Diego Chargers.

In 2004, Raiola started at center in all 16 games. The Lions' offensive line helped the team's rushing attack to be ranked second for the seven last games of the season. He again became responsible for long snapping after Jody Littleton incurred a hamstring injury against the Washington Redskins in the middle of November. His reliability and strong performance led to the Lions offering him a five-year contract extension in March 2005.

Raiola started 12 games in 2008 for the 0-16 Lions, dubbed by NFL Network "the Worst Team of All Time," eclipsing the 0-14 1976 Tampa Bay Buccaneers and the 12 straight losses of the 1977 Tampa Bay Buccaneers.

On June 26, 2009, the Lions signed Raiola to a four-year, $20 million extension through 2013. The deal included $9 million in guarantees.

Following the 2009 season, Raiola was named the recipient of the Detroit Lions/Detroit Sports Broadcasters Association/Pro Football Writers Association's Media-Friendly "Good Guy" Award. The Good Guy Award is given yearly to the Detroit Lions player who shows consideration to, and cooperation with the media at all times during the course of the season.

In the 2014 Thanksgiving Day game, Raiola became the first player in Detroit Lions history to start 200 games.

Controversies 
On December 9, 2008, he was fined $7,500 by the Lions organization after he made an obscene gesture towards heckling Lions fans after Detroit fell to 0–13 with a 20–16 loss to the Minnesota Vikings at Ford Field.

On November 1, 2009, Raiola had another run-in with fans who were heckling rookie quarterback Matthew Stafford.

After on-the-field warm-ups at the October 6, 2013, game at Lambeau Field in Green Bay, several members of the University of Wisconsin Marching Band accused Raiola of making verbal assaults including homophobic slurs and comments about the band members' weight. The Detroit Lions subsequently issued an apology to the band and reported the behavior was against team policy, but added Raiola would not be disciplined by the team. Raiola stated to the media that he has more important things to worry about, like wins and losses.

Following a game against the New England Patriots on November 23, 2014, the Detroit Free Press reported that Raiola admitted to taking a cheap shot at Patriots defensive tackle Zach Moore on last play of the game. The Patriots ran for a late touchdown when they could have taken three kneel-downs and ended the game with a 27–9 win over the Lions, and that decision rankled Raiola. Raiola said after the game that he tried to cut-block Moore on the Lions' final offensive snap as retaliation for the score, which resulted in an even more lopsided 34–9 loss for Detroit. "I cut him," Raiola said. "We took a knee, so I cut the nose (tackle). They went for six. They went for a touchdown at two minutes. They could have took three knees and the game could have been over. It's football. He wants to keep playing football, let's play football. Not a big deal. It's football." Patriots coach Bill Belichick responded during a press conference the following day, saying, "Sure there was a lot of frustration there with Raiola. He's never beaten us. Tough day for him."

NFL spokesman Michael Signora said the following Wednesday that Raiola was fined $10,000 for unnecessary roughness, but not for his cut block on Zach Moore on the game's final play. Instead, it was for a play against Moore earlier in the drive, when Moore beat him and Raiola appeared to try to club him from behind.

In December 2014, Raiola stepped on the ankle of the Chicago Bears' Ego Ferguson. The NFL suspended Raiola for one game without pay, and said that it was Raiola's sixth "safety-related rules violation since 2010".

Personal life
Raiola was born in Honolulu, Hawaii, to Tony and Wendy Raiola. He has a younger sister, Nicole, and a younger brother, Donovan, who played center for the Washington Redskins in 2011. His father, a native of Hawaii, was a defensive lineman for the University of Miami in the mid-1970s, but saw his career cut short due to a shoulder injury in 1977.

Raiola fathered an out-of-wedlock son with Andrea Yee in 2007. In December 2012, Yue sued Raiola after he allegedly ceased paying her $195,000 in annual support and care payments.

Raiola has a son, Dylan, who is one of the highest-rated high school quarterback recruits in the class of 2024. In May of 2022, Dylan verbally committed to play for the Ohio State Buckeyes, but later de-committed.

References

External links
 Detroit Lions Raiola biography
 NFL Raiola player page
 NFL Players Raiola biography

1978 births
Living people
All-American college football players
American football centers
Detroit Lions players
Nebraska Cornhuskers football players
Native Hawaiian people
Players of American football from Honolulu